Khaled Khalifa (born 1964) (sometimes in English written as Khalid Khalifa) is a Syrian novelist, screenwriter, and poet. He has been nominated three times for the International Prize for Arabic Fiction, including being shortlisted twice. 

His works have often been critical of the Syrian Baathist government and thus have been banned in the country.

Biography
Khalifa was born in Aleppo in 1964. He attended the University of Aleppo, where he earned a Bachelor of Arts in law. He wrote poetry and was a member of the Literary Forum there. As a screenwriter, Khalifa has written several television dramas, including Rainbow (Kaws Kozah) and Memoirs of Al-Jalali (Serat Al-Jalali), plus various documentaries, short films, and the feature-length film The Shrine Door (Bab al-Maqam). His first novel, Haris al-Khadi'a ("The Guard of Deception"), was published in 1993. His second novel, Dafatir al-Qurbat ("The Gypsy Notebooks"), was suppressed by the Union of Arab Writers for four years after its publication in 2000.

Khalifa spent thirteen years working on In Praise of Hatred (Madih al-karahiya), his third novel, which is about how the lives of one family are affected by the battle between the Syrian government and the Muslim Brotherhood. It was published in Damascus in 2006, until it was banned by the Syrian government, when it was republished in Beirut. Khalifa has stated these sort of book bans come from a bureaucracy which does not represent the higher levels of government, and he favors negotiation between artists and Syrian authorities to facilitate freedom of speech. He says his work is not intended to advocate any political ideology. 

Discussing In Praise of Hatred, he has stated: "above all, I wrote this novel in defense of the Syrian people and in order to protest against the suffering they have endured as a result of the religious and political dogmas that have tried to negate their ten-thousand-year civilisation." In Praise of Hatred was a finalist for the International Prize for Arabic Fiction (IPAF) (2008).

His fourth novel was La sakakin fi matabikh hadhihi al-madina ("No Knives in this City's Kitchens"), published in Cairo in 2013. It is about the "price that Syrians have paid under the rule of the Baath party" as headed by President Bashaar Al-Assad. It won the Naguib Mahfouz Medal for Literature. It was shortlisted for the IPAF in 2014.

Death Is Hard Work, translated by Leri Price, was named a finalist for the 2019 National Book Award for Translated Literature. 

No One Prayed Over Their Graves, Khalifa's latest novel, was longlisted for the IPAF in 2020.

Works
Note: Works that have not been translated in "quotes".
1993 Haris al-Khadi'a ("The Guard of Deception")
2000 Dafatir al-Qurbat ("The Gypsies' Notebooks")
2006 Madih al-karahiya (English trans. 2013, In Praise of Hatred)
2013 La sakakin fi matabikh hadhihi al-madina (English trans. 2016, No Knives in the Kitchens of This City)
2016 Al-mawt 'amal shaq (English trans. 2019: Death Is Hard Work)
2019 Lam yusil 'alayhum ahad ("No-one Prayed Over Their Graves")

Footnotes

External links

1964 births
Living people
People from Aleppo
Syrian poets
Syrian novelists
Syrian screenwriters
University of Aleppo alumni